Juan Arambula (born January 29, 1952 in Brownsville, Texas) is a former California State Assemblyman. He represented the 31st district. Arambula was elected to the Assembly in 2004. While Arambula had announced that he would retire in 2008, he ran again that year and won his final term. He was a Democrat until June 2009, when he became an independent. He was term limited in 2010.

Education and background
He graduated with high honors from Harvard University, and went on to earn a Master's degree in Educational Administration and Policy Analysis from the Stanford Graduate School of Education and a Juris Doctor (J.D.) from the University of California, Berkeley.

Arambula is the son of immigrant farm workers. In his youth, he harvested crops with his family throughout California. He lives in Fresno with Amy, his wife of 30 years. He has four adult children: Joaquin, Carmen, Diego and Miguel. His religion is "decline to state."

Pre-Assembly career
Prior to his election to the Assembly, Arambula served on the Fresno County Board of Supervisors from 1997 to 2004. He earned the Rose Ann Vuich Award for Ethics in Leadership in 2002 for his public service.

Early in his career, Assembly Member Arambula served as an attorney for the Agricultural Labor Relations Board. He also performed legal services for California Rural Legal Assistance (CRLA) in its Delano office.

From 1987 to 1996, Arambula served on the Fresno Unified School District Board, where he worked to meet the needs of a diverse student population while maintaining financial stability during lean budget years. Arambula also served on the Board of Directors for the California School Boards Association and the California State Association of Counties.

Priorities
Juan Arambula has stated that his top legislative priorities include efforts to improve California's business climate, to encourage job creation and retention, as well as efforts to improve the health care system, student academic achievement and school accountability. He is also working to tackle air pollution in the Central Valley, the shortage of health care professionals, and California's infrastructure challenges.

Recognition
Juan Arambula was named "Legislator of the Year" by the California Small Business Association.

Retribution for party change
Democratic Speaker Karen Bass stripped Arambula of his chairmanship of the Public Safety Committee in retribution for Arambula leaving the Democratic Party to become an independent.

References

AllBallots.com: Voting Records
Votesmart.com: Biography

1952 births
Living people
Hispanic and Latino American state legislators in California
Harvard University alumni
Members of the California State Assembly
Stanford Graduate School of Education alumni
California Democrats
People from Brownsville, Texas
California Independents
UC Berkeley School of Law alumni
21st-century American politicians